Stewart Cochrane (born 18 April 1963 in Dumfries) is a former Scottish professional footballer who played as a striker for his local club Queen of the South.

Background
Cochrane's father of the same name played once for the Doonhamers in 1957.

Playing career
Cochrane's career ran parallel to the early career of Ted McMinn who played for the same team in amateur football in the Dumfries area and after leaving school they both signed for Scottish Junior club Glenafton Athletic in New Cumnock at the same time. Both then left to join Queen of the South. As a target man, Cochrane fed-off the service of Queens two wingers, McMinn and Jimmy Robertson. Both mentioned Cochrane's contribution to the team when later interviewed by the club, as did former Queens manager Nobby Clark. The Doonhamers gained promotion from the Scottish Second Division in season 1985-86, as runners-up to Dunfermline Athletic by only two points. Then Cochrane was forced to cut-short his playing career after a serious knee injury in November 1986 at East End Park versus the Pars, as Queens went on to escape relegation at the end of the 1986-87 season from the Scottish First Division by only two points.

Honours

Queen of the South
Scottish Second Division Promotion: 1985-86

References

1963 births
Scottish footballers
Association football forwards
Living people
Queen of the South F.C. players
Glenafton Athletic F.C. players
Scottish Football League players
Footballers from Dumfries